Jack 2 (referred to on air as Jack 2 Hits) is an Independent Local Radio station broadcasting in Oxfordshire, United Kingdom on the Oxfordshire DAB multiplex and previously in Surrey and Hampshire on DAB and online. Until April 2020, it also broadcast on FM in Oxfordshire on 107.9FM.

It is a music-heavy station with only limited speech, instead allowing listeners to control the music and submit recordings of themselves to be played (through WhatsApp or the Jack 2 Hits app). The station is aimed at an young adult-contemporary audience and plays seven hours per week of specialist music as required by Ofcom. Jack 2 competes with Heart South, BBC Radio Oxford, First FM and sister station Jack FM, as well as some online Community Radio and DAB stations in Oxfordshire.

Previously known under a variety of names and formats since its inception in 1997 (see history), most recently Glide FM, the station launched in its current incarnation on 20 August 2013.

Before moving to Eynsham, Oxfordshire in March 2019, the station was based at 270 Woodstock Road in north Oxford - formerly the site of Six TV - The Oxford Channel.

As of September 2022, the station broadcasts to a weekly audience of 15,000, according to RAJAR.

History

The origins of the station lie in a student radio station, Oxygen 107.9 which was trialled in November 1995 and launched at 1.07pm on Valentine's Day 1997. It was acquired in late 2000 by Fusion Radio Holdings, which rebranded the station as Fusion 107.9. Fusion merged with the Milestone Group in 2003 and the station was relaunched again as Passion 107.9, but was sold to ARI Consultancy (previously known as Absolute Radio International) in 2006, leading to another rebrand as Oxford's FM 107.9.

In February 2010, the station's owners lodged a request with Ofcom to change the station's format to one that would target listeners over 45 years old. The station argued the "transient" nature of students makes it commercially difficult to market a radio station to an audience that leaves the city each year.   Several fans of late night "specialist" shows responded to Ofcom's public consultation as well as local business owners.  Ofcom considered this, but the Radio Licensing Committee rejected this proposal.  The station responded by saying that changes it had made meant the format change had become less necessary.

On 18 August 2010, after a publicity stunt where it briefly branded as Glee FM (airing only music from the American musical comedy-drama series Glee), the station relaunched as Glide FM. The new format would be positioned towards women.

The station relaunched again as Jack 2 on 20 August 2013. The station has a wide playlist (about 350 songs) which can be influenced by visitors to the website who can request and vote for tracks to be played, then be texted, e-mailed or tweeted on Twitter when they are going to broadcast.

References

External links
Jack FM 2
Media UK article
Oxford's FM 107.9 on MySpace
OfCom coverage map

Companies based in Oxford
Radio stations in Oxfordshire
Mass media in Oxford
Radio stations established in 2006